Auratonota sucumbiosa is a species of moth of the family Tortricidae. It is found in the East Cordillera of Ecuador.

The wingspan is about 36 mm. The ground colour of the forewings is brownish cream, with cream along the pattern elements and yellowish brown suffusions. The markings are dark brown. The hindwings are dark.

Etymology
The name refers to the type locality of the species.

References

Moths described in 2009
Auratonota
Moths of South America